Cuthbert Edward Bradley (1861– 25 November 1941) was an English painter, sporting writer and magazine illustrator.

Biography
Cuthbert Bradley was the eldest son of The Reverend Edward Bradley (1827 – 1889), who wrote under the pen name, 'Cuthbert Bede'. He graduated from King's College London, where he studied architecture.

He worked as a sporting journalist for The Field and as a magazine illustrator for Vanity Fair. He also wrote books about foxhunting. His paintings depicted scenes of foxhunting and polo.

His 1901 painting "King's Messenger" can be seen at the Penrhyn Castle. Other paintings are kept by Leicestershire County Council Museums Service.

He lived at The Lodge in Folkingham, Lincolnshire. He died there on 25 November 1941 and was buried at St Andrew's Church, Folkingham; he had been church warden at the church for the past 42 years.

Paintings
Ranelagh - Mr Milburn on Teddy Roosevelt
Mr J. Watson Webb, the left-handed American No. 3 going thirty miles an hour
Lewis Lacey on Marie Sol
Jupiter
County Cup Final Game, July 9, 1891Roehampton Open Challenge CupKings Messenger Held by a Groom (1901)The Ledbury Hounds (1913)Quorn Hounds, Cruiser and Woeful (1926)Fallible and Ranter (1926)Quorn Hounds, Batsman, Baffler, Weaver and Batchelor (1927)Quorn Hound, Wonderful (1929)Belvoir, Sir Gilbert Hart GreenallA Father of The BelvoirLady Ursula Manners (1936)

BibliographyThe Foxhound of the Twentieth Century; The Breeding and Work of the Kennels of England''
Hounds: Their Breeding and Kennel Management
The Reminiscences Of Frank Gillard (Huntsman) With The Belvoir Hounds-1860 To 1896 
Fox-Hunting from Shire to Shire (1912)

References

External links

 

1861 births
1941 deaths
People from Folkingham
Alumni of King's College London
19th-century English painters
English male painters
20th-century English painters
English male journalists
Vanity Fair (British magazine) artists
19th-century English male artists
20th-century English male artists